Liberty Grove is an unincorporated community in Lawrence County, Tennessee, United States. It is situated along Tennessee State Route 227 between Loretto to the northwest and the Alabama state line to the southeast, in southeastern Lawrence County.

References

Unincorporated communities in Lawrence County, Tennessee
Unincorporated communities in Tennessee